Rahmatabad (also Romanized as Raḥmatābād) is a village in Jahadabad Rural District, in the Central District of Anbarabad County, Kerman Province, Iran. At the 2006 census, its population was 464, in 110 families.

References 

Populated places in Anbarabad County